Tobias Lewicki (born 2 May 1993) is a Swedish former footballer who played as a midfielder.

Club career
Lewicki played his first and only Allsvenskan match for Malmö FF against Gefle IF on 2 April 2012. Lewicki was demoted to Malmö FF's youth team in early July 2012 and it was later announced that he had been sold to Trelleborgs FF in Sweden's second tier, Superettan.

Career statistics

Personal life
Lewicki has a cousin, Oscar Lewicki, who plays for Malmö FF.

References

External links
 
 

1993 births
Living people
Swedish footballers
Sweden youth international footballers
Footballers from Skåne County
Allsvenskan players
Superettan players
IF Limhamn Bunkeflo (men) players
Malmö FF players
Trelleborgs FF players
Association football midfielders